Children of the Sun is a 1905 play by Maxim Gorky, written while he was briefly imprisoned in Saint Petersburg's Peter and Paul Fortress during the abortive Russian Revolution of 1905.

Gorky appears to have written the play chiefly during the last eight days of his imprisonment, before his February 2, 1905 release, in response to the international protests over the imprisonment of such a prominent writer. It was nominally set during an 1862 cholera epidemic, but was universally understood to relate to contemporary events.

Production history

The play was initially banned, but imperial authorities allowed it to premiere in October of 1905 at the Komissarzhevskaya Theatre and Moscow Art Theatre. Given conditions in the city, the atmosphere was so tense that the audience began to panic in response to the mob noises in Act III. Kachalov had to stop the play to assure them that, while his character might be in danger from a mob, the audience was not.

Characters 
 Professor Pavel Protasov 
 Yelena, his wife
 Lisa, his sister 
 Dmitry Vagin, an artist
 Boris Chepurnoy
 Melanya, his sister
 Nazar Avdeyevich
 Misha, his son
 Yakov Troshin
 Egor, a locksmith
 Avdotya, his wife
 Antonovna, the nanny
 Fima, the maid
 Lusha, the maid
 Roman
 The Doctor

Plot 
The title refers to the privileged intellectual elite of Russia, epitomised by Protassoff, high-minded and idealistic, but basically unaware of what is going on around them in the lower depths. Lisa, in contrast, is sickly, nervous, and prophetically aware of impending crisis. It is set during an 1862 cholera epidemic in Russia in which fear drove people to mob action.

Protassov's detachment leaves him oblivious to the nearly mad Melanya's love for him; to his wife's confused love for his best friend and artist, Dmitri Vaguin; to the brutality of his assistant Yegor, and ultimately to the danger of the armed mob that comes to attack him.

References
 Adler, Jacob (1999). A Life on the Stage: A Memoir, translated and with commentary by Lulla Rosenfeld. New York: Knopf. , 333-336 (commentary).

1905 plays
Plays by Maxim Gorky